Kauã Jesus Tenório (born 2 September 2003), commonly known as Kauã, is a Brazilian footballer who currently plays as a midfielder for Oeste.

Career statistics

Club

Notes

References

2003 births
Living people
Brazilian footballers
Association football midfielders
Oeste Futebol Clube players